Michael Frederick Trench (May 1740 – April 1836) was an Irish Member of Parliament.

Biography
The son of the Rev. Frederick Trench and his wife Mary Moore, he was educated at Kilkenny College and Trinity College, Dublin and took the Grand Tour in 1770–1772. In July 1782 he was made a Justice of the Peace for county Roscommon. In 1785 he was returned to the Irish House of Commons for Maryborough in the by-election that followed the death of Sir Arthur Brooke, and sat until 1790. In 1789 he was appointed a commissioner and overseer of barracks and in 1803 he became chairman of the Barrack Board; he was also a governor of several hospitals. He lived at Heywood House, Ballinakill.  In 1774 he married Anne Helena Stewart; their elder son was General Sir Frederick William Trench and their youngest daughter Sarah Helena was the second wife of Sir Compton Domvile, 1st Baronet.

References

1740 births
1836 deaths
Frederick
People educated at Kilkenny College
Alumni of Trinity College Dublin
Irish MPs 1783–1790
Members of the Parliament of Ireland (pre-1801) for Queen's County constituencies